Leonard M. Miller School of Medicine (UMMSM) is the University of Miami's graduate medical school in Miami, Florida. Founded in 1952, it is the oldest medical school in the state of Florida.

Campus
The University of Miami's Leonard M. Miller School of Medicine is in the Health District area of Miami within the  University of Miami Jackson Memorial Medical Center complex. The medical center includes three University of Miami-owned hospitals that make up UHealth System: University of Miami Hospital, Sylvester Comprehensive Cancer Center, and Anne Bates Leach Eye Hospital, home to the top-ranked Bascom Palmer Eye Institute. 

Affiliated hospitals on the medical campus include Jackson Memorial Hospital, Holtz Children's Hospital, and Miami Veterans Administration Healthcare System. Jackson Memorial Hospital serves as the university's major teaching facility and is the largest hospital in the United States with 1,547 beds.

Academic affiliates

The majority of Miller School residency and fellowship training sponsored by Miller School of Medicine is offered in conjunction with Jackson Memorial Hospital and its health system in Miami-Dade County. Academic affiliates of the Miller School include:  

 Holy Cross Hospital (in Fort Lauderdale)
 Jackson Memorial Hospital (in Miami's Health District)
 JFK Medical Center (in Atlantis)
 University of Miami Hospital (in Miami's Health District)
 University of Miami Hospitals and Clinics/Sylvester Comprehensive Cancer Center (in Miami's Health District)
 Veterans Affairs Medical Center (in Miami's Health District)

Joint programs
Miller School of Medicine offers joint-degree programs in coordination with other disciplines at the University of Miami:
 M.D./Ph.D. in conjunction with the University of Miami's Program in Biomedical Sciences and Program in Public Health Sciences, through the Medical Scientist Training Program (MSTP)
 M.D./JD. in conjunction with the University of Miami School of Law
 M.D./MBA in conjunction with the University of Miami School of Business
 M.D./M.S. in Genomic Science
 M.D./MPH Beginning in 2011, the medical school and the University of Miami's Department of Public Health Sciences initiated a four-year joint M.D./M.P.H. program designed to train public health physicians. This is one of the few programs in the nation that enables students to complete both degrees concurrently.

Rankings
The University of Miami Miller School of Medicine received a record $149.5 million in NIH funding in 2019, the 39th largest recipient institution in the world and largest of any medical school in Florida. 

As of 2023, the University of Miami Miller School of Medicine school is ranked the 43rd best medical school in the nation for research by U.S. News & World Report. 

In 2022, the education ranking site EduRank ranked the University of Miami the top university in the world based on research performance in ophthalmology.

In 2018, U.S. News & World Report listed the University of Miami's Bascom Palmer Eye Institute as the best hospital in the nation for ophthalmology for a 15th consecutive year.  In addition, the University of Miami's Holtz Children's Hospital was nationally ranked in three pediatric specialties.
In December 2018, Expertscape recognized the Bascom Palmer Eye Institute as seventh best in the world for Type 1 diabetes care.

In 2012, U.S. News & World Report ranked the University of Miami Physical Therapy Department the ninth best such program in the nation.

Academic and research programs

 
 The University of Miami's Bascom Palmer Eye Institute is the top facility in the country for ophthalmology clinical care and research. The Anne Bates Leach Eye Hospital annually serves 160,000 outpatients of ophthalmology and other specialties, largely for microsurgery procedures.
 For its pioneering work in islet cell transplantation, Miller School's Diabetes Research Institute joined the National Institutes of Health and the Naval Medical Research Center as the only academic partner in this national initiative to cure diabetes through organ transplantation.
 The Sylvester Comprehensive Cancer Center treats 3,000 newly diagnosed cancer patients each year and treats thousands more in ongoing treatment from throughout the U.S. and Latin America. Approximately 200 cancer-related clinical trials are under way at the University of Miami's Sylvester Center, supported by more than $31 million in research grants.
 Dedicated to finding a cure for paralysis resulting from spinal cord injury, researchers at the University of Miami's Miami Project to Cure Paralysis found the first direct evidence of successful regeneration of adult human central nervous system tissue. The Miami Project conducts basic and clinical research trials and a program that permits spinal cord-injured men to father children.
 The University of Miami Ear Institute houses the nation's second most active cochlear implant program, restoring hearing to adults and children with profound deafness. The University of Miami's Barton G. Kids Hear Now Foundation Cochlear Implant Family Resource Center, dedicated to assisting hearing-challenged children and their families' transitions from a silent world into the hearing world through use of cochlear implant technology, opened at the Ear Institute in September 2010. 
 The School of Medicine's Mailman Center for Child Development has a number of model programs that help children with developmental disabilities. 
 The University of Miami Jackson Transplant Program is one of the nation's busiest, responsible for half of pediatric multivisceral transplants in the world. University of Miami Jackson has active transplant programs for bone marrow, heart, lungs, kidneys, liver, pancreas, and intestines.
 Significant federal funds support research at the University of Miami's Comprehensive AIDS Program, including HIV studies in pregnant women, pediatric HIV/AIDS clinical trials, various drug protocol studies, heterosexual transmission of AIDS, blood transfusion safety studies, and the national cooperative drug discovery group.
 University of Miami's Center on Aging, dedicated to enhancing the quality of life for older people, conducts significant research on geriatric challenges and issues.
 University of Miami's Center for Therapeutic Innovation (CTI), founded in 2011, brings together expertise in small molecule discovery, pharmacology and disease biology to enable academic drug discovery efforts. Several prominent projects include discovery of epigenetic modulators for cancer, inflammatory diseases, neuroscience and  programs centered on a variety of disease targets, including mucopolysaccharidosis, addiction, schizophrenia, fragile X syndrome, obesity, Alzheimer's disease, Parkinson's disease, and others.
The University of Miami's John P. Hussman Institute for Human Genomics applies genomics to the practice of medicine. In 2007 at the institute, Margaret Vance, MD and her University of Miami colleagues reported a new gene responsible for multiple sclerosis.
The University of Miami's Department of Physical Therapy offers an entry level clinical doctoral degree (DPT) and an academic doctoral degree (Ph.D.) in physical therapy.
The University of Miami's Interdisciplinary Stem Cell Institute researches the biology of stem cells and translates basic research into new regenerative therapies. In 2007, Joshua Hare, MD and his University of Miami colleagues reported that a new stem cell therapy was safe for treatment of myocardial infarctions and reduced complications from the condition.
The Miami Clinical and Translational Science Institute (CTSI) at the University of Miami was created in 2012 through an award by the National Institutes of Health's National Center for Advancing Translational Sciences. CTSI's mission is to be promote clinical and translational CT research and advance excellence in culturalized clinical and translational research.

Research
Miller School of Medicine has over 1,500 ongoing projects funded by more than $200 million in external grants and contracts to University of Miami faculty. The recently completed Building I of the University of Miami Life Science and Technology Park added an additional  of dedicated research space and is the first phase of a five building,  lab ready research park. It is located in Miami's Health District adjacent to the medical campus.

The Miami Project to Cure Paralysis is a research center dedicated to research in paralysis and spinal cord injury with an eventual goal of identifying a cure for paralyzing injuries. Based at Miller School of Medicine, the Miami Project is considered a world leader in neurological injury research. The center was founded in 1985 by a research physician and three others who had dealt with spinal cord injuries. Since its 1985 opening, the center has identified a family of genes that may control regeneration of the optic nerve. 

The Miller School of Medicine has developed the famed Harvey teaching mannequin that is able to recreate many physical findings of cardiology examinations, including palpation, auscultation, and electrocardiography. 

The University of Miami's Interdisciplinary Stem Cell Institute (ISCI) is leading cutting edge treatment for heart attacks that include injecting a person's own bone marrow stem cells to repair heart damage following a heart attack.

Admissions
In 2019, 463 out of 9,164 applicants to the Miller School of Medicine were interviewed for a class of 154 students. This entering class had an average overall GPA of 3.72, a science GPA of 3.67, and composite MCAT in the 87th percentile.

In 2018, 173 out of a total 9,164 applicants to Miller School's combined MD/MPH class were interviewed for a class of 54 students. The entering class presented an overall GPA average of 3.66, a science GPA of 3.54, and a composite MCATs in the 84th percentile.

Donations
In December 2004, the University of Miami School of Medicine received a $100 million donation from the family of Leonard M. Miller, former president and chief executive officer of Lennar. It was the single largest donation in University of Miami history at the time and the second largest gift ever given to any Florida university or college. The school was subsequently renamed that month in Miller's honor.

In February 2014, Oscar de la Renta recreated his entire Spring presentation, Designed for A Cure 2014 collection, to raise money for the Sylvester Comprehensive Cancer Center at the University of Miami Miller School of Medicine.

In October 2014, The Lennar Foundation announced a $50 million naming donation for a new UHealth ambulatory care center in Coral Gables. To be located adjacent to the main University of Miami campus, the new Lennar Foundation Medical Center at UHealth Coral Gables will expand outpatient access to UHealth physicians in South Miami. Future plans include relocating UMiami Student Health Center to a new facility.

In May 2015, Stuart Miller, chairman of Lennar and chairman of the University of Miami Board of Trustees, unveiled a $50 million donation for construction of a new medical education building to be located on the main medical center campus.

Notable alumni
 Maria T. Abreu (alumni and faculty), gastroenterologist
 Daniel T. Barry (alumni), astronaut
 Gregory Hemingway  (alumni), son of Ernest Hemingway
 Glenn Laffel (alumni), physician and health IT entrepreneur
 Ferdie Pacheco (alummi), American physician, personal physician of Muhammad Ali, accomplished artist, sports commentator
 David Perlmutter (alumni), American physician, author, and scholar
 Michael Welner  (alumni), forensic psychiatrist
 Eliseo J. Pérez-Stable  (alumni), physician-scientist, director of National Institute on Minority Health and Health Disparities
 Paul Alan Wetter (alumni and faculty), minimally invasive and robotic surgery innovator

Notable faculty
 Maria T. Abreu, (alumni and faculty), gastroenterologist
 Thomas J. Balkany, neurotology and otorhinolaryngology
 Mary Bartlett Bunge, neuroscience and paralysis 
 Erin Marcus, internal medicine
 Paul Alan Wetter, (alumni and faculty), Minimally Invasive and Robotic Surgery Pioneer and Innovator

In popular culture
On FX's reality television series Nip/Tuck, plastic surgeons Sean McNamara and Christian Troy are graduates of the University of Miami School of Medicine.

See also
List of University of Miami alumni

References

External links

University of Miami Leonard M. Miller School of Medicine
University of Miami Miller School of Medicine Internal Medicine residency website
Jackson Memorial Hospital

Education in Miami
Boca Raton, Florida
Leonard M. Miller School of Medicine
University of Miami
Educational institutions established in 1952
1952 establishments in Florida